Longhua station may refer to:

 Longhua station (Shanghai Metro), a station on the Shanghai Metro in Shanghai
 Longhua station (Shenzhen Metro), a station on the Shenzhen Metro in Shenzhen, Guangdong